The 1974 Hardie-Ferodo 1000 was an endurance race for Group C Touring Cars, held at the Mount Panorama Circuit near Bathurst in New South Wales, Australia on 6 October 1974. The race was  Round 3 of the 1974 Australian Manufacturers' Championship and was the 15th in a sequence of annual “Bathurst 1000” races commencing with the 1960 Armstrong 500.

The wettest race in the event's history to that time saw John Goss and Kevin Bartlett take victory in a Ford Falcon GT under pressure in the late stages from the Holden Torana SL/R 5000 L34 of Bob Forbes and Wayne Negus. New Zealand drivers Jim Richards and Rod Coppins finished third, five laps down in another Holden Torana SL/R 5000 L34. 1974 marked what was the longest running in the race's history at the time, at 7h 50m 59.01s. This record stood until the 2014 race, which ran for 7h 58m 53.20s.

The No.1 Holden Dealer Team Torana of pole winner Peter Brock and Brian Sampson dominated the first ⅔ of the race and had built up a 6 lap lead over the field until their race was ended on lap 118.  The expected challenge from defending race winner Allan Moffat and his co-driver, 1971 European Touring Car Champion Dieter Glemser in their XB Falcon was in trouble early. Moffat, who had easily won the Sandown 250 a month earlier, only qualified in 15th place and after numerous engine and gearbox problems, the Falcon was retired after 92 laps with engine failure.

Class structure
Cars competed in four engine capacity classes.

Up to 1300cc
The Up to 1300cc class was contested by Alfa Romeo GT 1300 Junior, Datsun 1200, Ford Escort, Honda Civic, Mazda 1300, Morris Cooper S and Morris Clubman GT.

1301 – 2000cc
The 1301 – 2000cc class was contested by Alfa Romeo Alfetta, Alfa Romeo 2000 GTV, Datsun 180B, Ford Escort, Mazda RX-3 and Volkswagen Passat.

2001 – 3000cc
The 2001 – 3000cc class was contested by BMW 3.0Si, Datsun 240K, Ford Capri, Holden Torana, Leyland Marina and Mazda RX-3.

3001 – 6000cc
The 3001 – 6000cc class was contested by Ford Falcon, Holden Monaro and Holden Torana.

Top 10 Qualifiers

Results

Statistics
 Pole Position – No.1 Peter Brock – 2:30.8
 Fastest Lap – No.1 Peter Brock – 2:29.8 (Average Speed 128 km/h) (lap record)
 Race time for winning car – 7:51:43

References

External links
  1974 Hardie Ferodo 1000 Race Program at www.uniquecarsandparts.com.au  
  Bathurst 1974 images at www.autopics.com.au
 Images at www.oldracephotos.com

Motorsport in Bathurst, New South Wales
Hardie-Ferodo 1000